Yar Mohammad-e Alam (also Romanized as Yār Moḩammad-e ‘Alam; also known as Yār Moḩammad) is a village in Dust Mohammad Rural District, in the Central District of Hirmand County, Sistan and Baluchestan Province, Iran. At the 2006 census, its population was 463, in 109 families.

References 

Populated places in Hirmand County